The 1939 Star World Championship was held in Kiel, Germany in 1939. The hosting yacht club was Yacht-Club von Deutschland and Norddeutscher Regatta Verein.

Results

References

External links
 

Star World Championships
1939 in sailing
Sailing competitions in Germany
Sport in Kiel
1939 in German sport
January 1939 sports events